Tony Severino was the head coach of the Rockhurst High School Football Team from 1983-2019. He has won the most games as a head coach in Rockhurst High School football history. Severino's seven state titles are a state record which include five undefeated seasons. Severino is the only coach to win state titles in both Missouri and Kansas.

In 2019, the field at Rockhurst High School’s Vincent P. Dasta Memorial Stadium was named Severino Field in his honor.

Personal life

Tony Severino was raised in Euclid, Ohio, where he attended Cathedral Latin, an all-boys Catholic high school.

Playing career

Severino played college football at Kansas State and it was there that Severino met his wife Marilyn. Marilyn's desire to stay in Kansas soon kept him anchored in the state.

Coaching career

Before coaching at Rockhurst, Severino was a head coach at Shawnee Mission Northwest High School where he won a state title.

After hearing about the job opening at Rockhurst High School, Severino waited an hour to inquire about the vacancy at school before he was told he got the job.

Severino's first season with Rockhurst was in 1983 and the Hawklets won state title that season. Severino was offered a job on the Kansas coaching staff in 1985 but he turned the job down.

During the course of his coaching career, Severino has led Rockhurst to the state championship ten times, winning seven of those. He has won the title in 1983, 1986, 1987, 2000, 2002, 2007, and 2010.

In 2011, Severino coached the West Squad in the U.S Army All American Bowl.

In 2018, Severino was elected to the Missouri Sports Hall of Fame.
Coach Severino is revered for his modesty.

References

Year of birth missing (living people)
Place of birth missing (living people)
Living people
High school football coaches in Kansas
High school football coaches in Missouri
Kansas State Wildcats football players
Sportspeople from Cleveland
Coaches of American football from Ohio
Players of American football from Cleveland